Riksvei 159 (Rv159) is a four-laned motorway between Karihaugen in Oslo and Lillestrøm in Skedsmo. The road is 11.4 km, of which 1.7 km is in Oslo and 9.7 km is in Akershus.

159
Streets in Oslo
Roads in Lørenskog
Roads in Skedsmo
Roads in Rælingen
Roads in Viken